is a passenger railway station in located in the town of Kihō, Minamimuro District, Mie, Japan, operated by Central Japan Railway Company (JR Tōkai).

Lines

Station layout
The station consists of one side platform serving bi-directional traffic. The original station building, dating from the opening of the line, was demolished and replaced by a smaller, simpler waiting-room structure in 2012. The station is unattended.

Platforms

History 
Kii-Ida Station opened on 8 August 1940, as a station on the Japanese Government Railways (JGR) Kisei-Nishi Line. The JGR became the Japan National Railways (JNR) after World War II, and the line was renamed the Kisei Main Line on 15 July 1959.  The station has been unattended since 21 December 1983. The station was absorbed into the JR Central network upon the privatization of the JNR on 1 April 1987.

Passenger statistics
In fiscal 2019, the station was used by an average of 34 passengers daily (boarding passengers only).

Surrounding area
Kiho Town Ida Elementary School
Kiho Town Hall Ida Branch
Ida Kannon

See also
List of railway stations in Japan

References

External links

  JR Central timetable 

Railway stations in Japan opened in 1940
Kihō
Railway stations in Mie Prefecture